Mandesh is the historical name by which  the mountain region of Ghor was called.

Having major historical places which famoused The time of war of marathe vs Mughal saltanat.

History
The region was governed under a Malik named 'Amir Suri' and the population  was not yet converted to Islam.

Mandeshi maayboli 
Ghōr Province
Sur (Pashtun tribe)

Notes

References

Geographic history of Afghanistan